The International Tamil Film Awards (ITFA) is an awards ceremony that honours excellence in Tamil language films around the world since 2003.

History 

The awards began in 2003 and the awards honour films from the previous calendar year.

Awards 
 Best Picture
 Best Director
 Best Actor
 Best Actress
 Best Supporting Actor
 Best Supporting Actress
 Best New Actor
 Best New Actress
 Best Villain
 Best Comedian (Male)
 Best Comedian (Female)
 Best Music Director
 Best Cinematographer
 Best Lyricist
 Best Male Playback
 Best Female Playback

See also
 Tamil Cinema
 Cinema of India

References

External links
 ITFA.com Official website
 Sunnetwork.com SUN TV - Official  broadcaster of ITFA

 
Tamil-language films
Tamil film awards